The Border Legion is a lost 1924 American silent Western film directed by William K. Howard and starring Antonio Moreno and Helene Chadwick. Written by George C. Hull and based on the 1916 novel The Border Legion by Zane Grey, the film is about a cowboy who is wrongly accused of murder and is rescued by the leader of a band of Idaho outlaws known as the Border Legion. When the outlaws kidnap a young woman, the cowboy knows that he must help the woman escape. The film premiered on October 19, 1924 in New York City and was released in the United States on November 24, 1924 by Paramount Pictures.

Plot
After Joan Randle (Helene Chadwick) accuses her fiancé Jim Cleve (Antonio Moreno) of being worthless, Jim travels to Idaho where he is wrongly accused of murder. He is rescued by Kells (Rockliffe Fellowes), the leader of a band of outlaws known as the Border Legion. Jim decides to join the outlaw band.

Meanwhile, Joan regrets how she treated her former sweetheart and follows him out West, where she is captured by Kells and is forced to shoot him in self-defense. In the coming days, Joan nurses Kells back to health, and the grateful outlaw soon falls in love with her. During a mining camp raid, Jim and Joan manage to escape, but while traveling by stagecoach, the legion catches up to them, Jim is shot and left for dead, and Joan is taken captive.

At the hideout, Kells and Gulden (Gibson Gowland) cut cards to see who ends up with Joan and the gold from the recent raid. Gulden wins the cut, but just then an injured Jim arrives and tries to save Joan from her dastardly captors. During the struggle, Kells and Gulden draw guns on each other, and both are killed in the exchange. Jim and Joan are reunited.

Cast
 Antonio Moreno as Jim Cleve
 Helene Chadwick as Joan Randle
 Rockliffe Fellowes as Kells
 Gibson Gowland as Gulden
 Charles Ogle as Harvey Roberts
 Jim Corey as Pearce
 Eddie Gribbon as Blicky
 Luke Cosgrave as Bill Randle

Critical response
The Border Legion received a mixed review in Variety magazine.

Adaptations
The 1916 novel The Border Legion by Zane Grey was first adapted to film in 1918 with The Border Legion, directed by T. Hayes Hunter and starring Blanche Bates, Hobart Bosworth, and Eugene Strong. This 1924 adaptation directed by William K. Howard and starring Antonio Moreno and Helene Chadwick was the second silent film version produced by Paramount Pictures. Paramount would produce two more adaptations. In 1930, the first sound film adaptation was directed by Otto Brower and Edwin H. Knopf, The Border Legion, starring Jack Holt and Fay Wray. Finally in 1934, The Last Round-Up was released, directed by Henry Hathaway and starring Randolph Scott and Barbara Fritchie.

References
Notes

Bibliography

External links

 
 
 

1924 films
1924 Western (genre) films
Films based on works by Zane Grey
American black-and-white films
Films directed by William K. Howard
Lost Western (genre) films
Lost American films
1924 lost films
Silent American Western (genre) films
1920s American films
1920s English-language films